Toyokuni Susumu  (born 30 November 1937 as Susumu Otsuka) is a former sumo wrestler from Nakatsu, Ōita, Japan. He made his professional debut in May 1960, and reached the top division in November 1961. He earned seven gold stars against grand champion yokozuna in the course of his career. His highest rank was komusubi. He retired in January 1968.

Career record

See also
Glossary of sumo terms
List of past sumo wrestlers
List of sumo tournament second division champions
List of komusubi

References

1937 births
Living people
Japanese sumo wrestlers
People from Nakatsu, Ōita
Sumo people from Ōita Prefecture